MMIS may refer to:

 Maintenance Management Information System
 Medicaid Management Information System
 Manara Management Information System
 Modified Mercalli intensity scale